Winstone is a surname and occasional given name. Notable people with the name include:

 Alec Winstone (1879–1963), English cricketer
 Andrew Winstone (born 1975), English cricketer
 Dorothy Winstone (1919–2014), New Zealand educationalist and academic
 Edith Winstone Blackwell (née Winstone, 1877–1956), New Zealand philanthropist
 Eric Winstone (1913–1974), English band leader
 H. V. F. Winstone (1926–2010), English author and journalist
 Howard Winstone (1939–2000), Welsh boxer
 Jaime Winstone (born 1985), English actress
 James Winstone (1863–1921), British trade unionist
 Jane Winstone (1912–1944), New Zealand aviator
 Lincoln Arthur Winstone Efford (1907–1962), New Zealand pacifist
 Lois Winstone (born 1982), English actress
 Michael Winstone (born 1958), Canadian-born English sculptor
 Norma Winstone (born 1941), English jazz singer and lyricist
 Ray Winstone (born 1957), English actor
 Reece Winstone (1909–1991), English photographer
 Richard Winstone (1699–1787), English stage actor
 Simon Winstone (born 20th century), British author, screenwriter and script editor
 Simon Winstone (footballer) (born 1974), English footballer
 Winstone Zulu (1964–2011), Zambian HIV and TB activist

See also
 Winston (name)